Bright Side is the first studio album from OBB. Curb Records released the album on September 30, 2014. They worked with Justin Ebach in the production of this album.

Critical reception

Awarding the album four stars at Worship Leader, Jay Akins states, "Bright Side is a solid offering of music that works well in a student ministry or outreach setting." Sarah Fine, giving the album four stars by New Release Today, writes, "Technicalities aside, this is a strong debut from a band that has the potential to stay the course for years to come." Rating the album four stars from 365 Days of Inspiring Media, Jonathan Andre says, "what Bright Side delivers is good radio pop- and if the album is taken and listened as it is rather than what we all wish it to be, the album will serve as a great vessel for praise and worship, which is exactly what OBB accomplish within these 12 tracks."

Track listing

Chart performance

References

2014 albums
Curb Records albums